A dominant culture is a cultural practice that is dominant  within a particular political, social or economic entity, in which multiple cultures co-exist. It may refer to a language, religion/ritual, social value  and/or social custom. These features are often a norm for an entire society. An individual achieves dominance by being perceived as pertaining to a majority of the population and having a significant presence in institutions relating to communication, education, artistic expression, law, government and business. The concept of "dominant culture" is generally used in academic discourse in fields such as communication, sociology, anthropology and cultural studies.

In a society, culture is established and directed by the individuals with most power (hegemony). In a culture, a group of people that have the ability to hold power over social institutions and influence the rest of the society's beliefs and actions is considered dominant. A dominant culture, or cultural hegemony, is established in a society by a group of individuals that direct the ruling ideas, values, and beliefs that become the dominant worldview of a society. Individuals from the dominant culture spread their dominant ideologies through institutions such as education, religion, and politics. Dominant culture make use of media and laws to spread their ideologies as well. Furthermore, a dominant culture can be promoted deliberately and by the suppression of minority cultures or subcultures.

The culture that is dominant within a particular geopolitical entity can change over time in response to internal or external factors, but one is usually very resilient. Antonio Gramsci imply that the masses are in the grip of a monolithic ruling class. However, the overall picture that Gramsci provides is not a static, closed system of ruling-class domination. Rather, it is a society in constant process, where the creation of counter-hegemonies remains a live option.

The concept of a dominant culture, or the concept of hegemony, originated in Ancient Greece. Although Vladimir Lenin, a politician and a political theorist, defined the concept as “Domination,” Gramsci redefined it as “An intellectual and moral leadership directed by contradictory political and, cultural agents and organizations.” He called these organizations “organic and traditional intellectuals” which represented the interest of the working class.

Examples of dominant cultures
In the United States, for example, a distinction is often made between the indigenous culture of Native Americans, and a dominant culture that may be described as "WASP", "Anglo", "white", "middle class", and so on.  Some Native Americans are seen as being part of the culture of their own tribe, community, or family, while simultaneously participating in the dominant culture of America as a whole. Also, ethnic groups are said to exist in the United States in relation to a dominant culture, generally seen as English-speaking, of European ancestry, and Protestant Christian faith. Asian Americans, Jews, African Americans, Latinos, and Deaf people, among others, are seen as facing a choice to oppose, be opposed by, assimilate into, acculturate (i.e. exist alongside), or otherwise react to the dominant culture.

Interactions between dominant culture and co-culture 
Co-culture consists of minority groups, or groups whose beliefs and values differ from the dominant culture.  Minority groups such as LGBTQ+, women, and black people or African American members, for example, can experience negative effects resulting from their interaction with the dominant culture. Minority groups can be victims of stress produced by the dominant culture. Minority stress can be described as the product that results from the differences between the minority and dominant values. Furthermore, minority stress is the outcome of the conflict that minority group members experience with their social environment.

LGBTQ+ Community 
Members from the LGBTQ+ community, that live in a heterosexist society, are susceptible and inclined to suffer from chronic stress due to their stigmatization. Minority stressors include internalized homophobia, stigma and experiences of violence and discrimination. Internalized homophobia can be described as an LGBTQ+ member's disposition to societal negative attitudes towards the self while stigma refers to an LGBTQ+ member's expectation of discrimination and rejection.

Women 
Women, as many other co-culture groups, are greatly affected by the dominant culture that surround them. The dominant culture tend to perceive women as less worthy of economic and educational opportunities. Also, In many cultures, women are expected to behave in a certain way and be responsible for tasks that men are not as they are also subject to double standards. These interactions can lead to unfavorable and negative effects on women. For example, women can feel restricted from expressing freely, fighting for their aspirations, and trying new activities.

Black and African American community 
Globally, black or African American communities have been affected by the dominant cultures. In different countries, in order for black people to incorporate into the cultural hegemony, they were frequently isolated from their own cultural group, or an attempt was made to eradicate their culture completely. Many examples of cultural alienation and annihilation can be found across black and African American communities.

See also 
 Hegemony
 Dominant narrative

References 

Cultural concepts
Anthropology
Cultural studies